Speargrass is an unincorporated place in the Canadian province of Alberta within Wheatland County that is recognized as a designated place by Statistics Canada.

History 
The community of Speargrass was approved for development by Wheatland County on December 12, 1997 through its adoption of the Speargrass Area Structure Plan (ASP). The first residential subdivision was registered in 2003.

Geography 
Speargrass is on the north side of the Bow River at the intersection of Highway 24 and Highway 817.

Demographics 

Attractions 
The community of Speargrass is surrounded by the Speargrass Golf Course. The 18-hole golf course opened in 2003. The Wyndham-Carseland Provincial Park is to the south of Speargrass across the Bow River.

References 

Designated places in Alberta
Unincorporated communities in Alberta
Wheatland County, Alberta